Kurów may refer to the following places in Poland:
Kurów in Puławy County, Lublin Voivodeship (east Poland)
Kurów, Lower Silesian Voivodeship (south-west Poland)
Kurów, Bełchatów County in Łódź Voivodeship (central Poland)
Kurów, Kutno County in Łódź Voivodeship (central Poland)
Kurów, Wieluń County in Łódź Voivodeship (central Poland)
Kurów, Łuków County in Lublin Voivodeship (east Poland)
Kurów, Nowy Sącz County in Lesser Poland Voivodeship (south Poland)
Kurów, Świętokrzyskie Voivodeship (south-central Poland)
Kurów, Sucha County in Lesser Poland Voivodeship (south Poland)
Kurów, Konin County in Greater Poland Voivodeship (west-central Poland)
Kurów, Ostrów Wielkopolski County in Greater Poland Voivodeship (west-central Poland)
Kurów, West Pomeranian Voivodeship (north-west Poland)